"Shisha" is a single by Lebanese Canadian singer Massari. It is the third single off his first EP Hero. The song was released on May 21, 2013 and features vocals from American rapper French Montana. The song peaked at number 37 on the Canadian Hot 100. It received a Gold certification from Music Canada, denoting sales of 40,000 units in that country.

Music video
The video was directed by Canadian director RT! and made its premiere on MuchMusic's New.Music.Live. on July 4. The video features Massari's manager Manny Dion around the 0:25 mark in the video. The video follows a Middle Eastern theme with Massari and French Montana smoking shishas, various numbers of women wearing Indian garb dancing with a sunlit curtain in the background and a lion. Intercut in the video are scenes of the Palace of Culture and Science from Warsaw, the Burj Al Arab from Dubai and the CN Tower from Toronto set in the nighttime.

Chart performance
The song debuted at number 78 on the week of June 28, 2013. Ten weeks later, it peaked at number 37 on the week of August 24, 2013. It spent a total of 19 weeks on the chart.

Certifications

References

External links
 

2013 singles
2013 songs
CP Music Group singles
Massari songs
French Montana songs
Songs written by Breyan Isaac
Songs written by French Montana
Songs written by Massari
Songs written by Ovi Bistriceanu